Sphenopalatine may refer to:
 sphenopalatine artery, an artery of the head, commonly known as the artery of epistaxis
 sphenopalatine ganglion (or "pterygopalatine ganglion")
 sphenopalatine nerves
 sphenopalatine foramen, a foramen in the skull that connects the nasal cavity with the pterygopalatine fossa